Peter Michael Waterhouse is a British-Australian plant virologist and geneticist. He is a professor at the Queensland University of Technology.

Biography
Peter Waterhouse received his Bachelor of Science degree (1977) from the University of Newcastle upon Tyne, UK, and his Doctor of Philosophy degree (1981) from the Scottish Crop Research Institute at the University of Dundee. He joined CSIRO Plant Industry as a Research Scientist in 1981 and was the leader of the virology program from 1989 to 1999 (excluding 1992). In 2008, he was awarded the Federation Fellowship and took up a professorship in the School of Molecular and Microbial Biosciences at the University of Sydney. Following the conclusion of this fellowship, Waterhouse left the University of Sydney and took up a professorial appointment at the Queensland University of Technology in 2014.

In the late 1990s, Waterhouse led the CSIRO group which discovered that gene silencing and transgene-mediated virus resistance in plants were induced and targeted by double-stranded RNAs.

Awards
 Victor Chang Medal (2002)
 IMTC-ISI / Thomson Highly Cited in Field Award (2004)
 CSIRO Chairman's Medal (2005) (with Ming-Bo Wang)
 Winner of The Bulletin's Smartest Scientists in Australia (2007) (with Ming-Bo Wang)
 Prime Minister's Prize for Science (2007) (with Ming-Bo Wang)
 Australian Research Council Federation Fellowship (2008)
 Elected Fellow of the Australian Academy of Science (2009)
 Australian Laureate Fellowship 2016

Publications

References

External links
 Group Homepage at the University of Sydney
 Peter Waterhouse at Google Scholar Citations

Living people
British emigrants to Australia
21st-century Australian botanists
Australian geneticists
Australian virologists
Fellows of the Australian Academy of Science
Alumni of Newcastle University
Alumni of the University of Dundee
Academic staff of the University of Sydney
Year of birth missing (living people)
Australian phytopathologists